Anthony "Pooka" Williams Jr. (born June 19, 1999) is an American football running back for the St. Louis BattleHawks of the XFL. He played college football at Kansas. He was named First Team All-Big 12 running back as a freshman and as a sophomore. He signed with the Bengals as an undrafted free agent in 2021.

High school
Williams got the nickname "Pooka" from his grandmother as a child. He attended high school at Hahnville High School in Boutte, Louisiana. As a senior he ran for 3,118 yards and 37 touchdowns. Hahnville lost in the Louisiana 5A State Championship his senior year. For his performance his senior year, he was named Louisiana Mr. Football. Williams was a four-star recruit out of high school, according to ESPN.com. He received offers from LSU, Memphis, Kansas, Mississippi State, and TCU. On February 12, 2017, he committed to Kansas.

|}

College career

Freshman season
Williams was heavily recruited by then Kansas head coach David Beaty, and signed with Kansas in 2018. Williams played his first game at Kansas in their second game of the season against Central Michigan. He ran for 125 yards and 2 touchdowns as he helped lead Kansas to their first road victory since 2009. The following week, he rushed 161 yards and 1 touchdown. He would go on to rush for over 100 yards two more times during the season, including recording 252 rushing yards against Oklahoma. Williams finished the season with 1,125 yards and 7 touchdowns. For his performance as a freshman, Williams was named 1st Team All-Big 12 and Offensive Freshman of the Year.

Sophomore season
Following an offseason arrest, Williams was suspended for the majority off the off-season before being reinstated in July. He did also serve a 1 game suspension for the Jayhawks season opener against Indiana State. Prior to the season, Williams was named Preseason 1st team All-Big 12. He made his season debut against Coastal Carolina rushing for 99 yards and zero touchdowns in the Jayhawks 7–12 loss. The following week against Boston College, he rushed for 121 yards and one touchdown helping the Jayhawks to their first Power Five conference road win in 48 games. He would rush for over 100 yards three more times during the season, including a season high 190 yards in a 48–50 loss to Texas. Williams finished the season with 1,042 becoming only the second Jayhawk, along with James Sims, to rush for 1,000 yards in back-to-back seasons. He also broke College Football Hall of Famer Gale Sayers record for most rushing yards in a player’s first two seasons. He was named 1st team All-Big 12 for the second consecutive season.

Junior season
On July 16, 2020, Williams was named pre-season 1st team All-Big 12 for the second consecutive season. He was also named to the Maxwell Award preseason watch list, which awards the nation's overall best player. In the Jayhawks first game of the season, he rushed for 67 yards and no touchdowns in the 23–38 loss. The following week against Baylor, he rushed for two touchdowns in the 14–47 loss. On October 18, he was named Big 12 Special Teams Player of the Week after returning a kickoff 92 yards for a touchdown in a loss to West Virginia. The following day he announced he would be opting out of the remainder of the season to be closer to his mother and family in Louisiana. He released a statement on Twitter saying: "Family and health are the most important things to me. Right now I need to be with my mother, who is battling health issues. I want to thank Coach Miles and everyone with the Kansas Football program for their commitment and understanding." He declared for the 2021 NFL Draft on December 6, 2020. He finished his college career with 2,363 rushing yards, good for 9th all-time in Kansas history, 5.7 yards per carry average, and 12 rushing touchdowns.

College statistics

Professional career

NFL

Williams entered the draft as the 20th ranked running back, according to Sports Illustrated. He was projected as a seventh round pick.

After going undrafted, Williams signed with the Cincinnati Bengals as an undrafted free agent on May 14, 2021, where he was reunited with his teammate from Kansas, Hakeem Adeniji. Williams moved to wide receiver for the Bengals. He was released on August 31, 2021. The following day, he was signed to the Bengals' practice squad. He was elevated to the active roster via a standard elevation on December 4, 2021. He made his NFL debut against the Los Angeles Chargers playing primarily as the team's kick returner for the game.

On February 15, 2022, Williams signed a reserve/future contract. He was waived on August 14, 2022.

XFL
Williams was drafted by the DC Defenders in the seventh round of the 2023 XFL Draft. He was waived by the Defenders and claimed off waivers by the St. Louis BattleHawks on March 8, 2023.

Personal life
On July 19, 2021, Williams announced on his Twitter that he was expecting his first child, a girl.

Following the end of his freshman season at Kansas, Williams was arrested for domestic battery on December 7, 2018. Following the arrest, Kansas head coach Les Miles announced that he will be suspended from team activities during the investigation. On January 9, 2019, he was granted a diversion for his arrest.

References

External links
Kansas profile
Bengals profile

Living people
DC Defenders players
Cincinnati Bengals players
Kansas Jayhawks football players
Players of American football from New Orleans
American football running backs
American football wide receivers
African-American players of American football
1999 births
21st-century African-American sportspeople
St. Louis BattleHawks players